Park Ha-sun (born October 22, 1987) is a South Korean actress.

Career
Park debuted in 2005 with the TV series Love Needs a Miracle and rose to stardom with her role as Queen Inhyeon in MBC's 2010 historical drama Dong Yi, followed by a comedic turn as a teacher in the popular sitcom High Kick: Revenge of the Short Legged that aired in 2011–2012. She has since appeared in the films The Last Blossom (2011), Champ (2011), and Tone-deaf Clinic (2012).

In March 2019, Park signed with new agency KeyEast. Later, in March 2022, Park renewed her contract for the second time.

Personal life
Park Ha-sun married actor Ryu Soo-young in a private ceremony at the Mayfield Hotel in Seoul on January 22, 2017. Their romantic relationship started in 2014. They also worked together in the television drama Two Weeks (2013).

They welcomed their first child, a daughter, on August 2, 2017.

‎Philanthropy 
On March 15, 2022, Park made a donation  million to the Hope Bridge Disaster Relief Association along with Ryu Soo-young to help those who have been damaged by the massive wildfire that started in Uljin, Gyeongbuk and has continued to spread. Samcheok, Gangwon.

On March 16, 2022, Park donated 10 million won for emergency relief in Ukraine to Korea's first international relief and development NGO Hope Friend Measures for Hunger.

On May 28, 2022, Park donated 10 million won to the Heart Heart Orchestra, which comprises developmental disabilities.

On November 6, 2022, Park donated clothes and diapers to an orphanage, by posting via SNS.

Filmography

Film

Television series

Web series

Television show

Web shows

Radio

Hosting

Music video

Theater

Discography

Awards and nominations

State honors

References

External links
 
 
 
 

South Korean television actresses
South Korean film actresses
South Korean web series actresses
1987 births
People from Seoul
South Korean female models
Living people
Dongguk University alumni
Best Variety Performer Female Paeksang Arts Award (television) winners